Torgaska (Torğaś) is a rural locality (a khutor) in Skvorchikhinsky Selsoviet, Ishimbaysky District, Bashkortostan, Russia. The population was 8 as of 2010. There are 2 streets.

Geography 
Torgaska is located 23 km southeast of Ishimbay (the district's administrative centre) by road. Lesnoye is the nearest rural locality.

References 

Rural localities in Ishimbaysky District